Kubizuka (首塚, literally neck mound in Japanese, often translated as head tomb) is a burial mound built in Japan with purpose of rest for the souls whose heads were severed because they were killed in battles and fights, captured, or punished by beheadings.

In Japan war performances were verified by identifying the heads of those killed in the battle; in order to console those heads, many kubizuka were built.

There are kubizuka enshrining a single person (like an enemy samurai commander), so they do not become a vengeful onryō later, and kubizuka enshrining many soldiers killed in one battle (huge one like the Battle of Sekigahara) together, even though they were zohyo (common soldiers); a great number of both types of kubizuka still exist throughout Japan.

Related subjects 
Mimizuka (耳塚, ear mound, an alteration of the original hanazuka 鼻塚, nose mound ) is a tomb where the noses of the killed Korean and Chinese soldiers and civilians  in the Japanese invasions of Korea (1592–1598) were gathered and buried as the substitute of heads, because it was impossible to bring back the severed heads from overseas; it has the same symbolic meaning as kubizuka. It is located near the front of present-day Toyokuni Shrine (Kyoto), and originally was in front of the gate of Hoko-ji Temple in Higashiyama Ward in Kyoto.

Kubizuka across Japan 
 Kubizuka of Akechi Mitsuhide: located at the side of Mochitora confectionery shop at Sanjo-Sagaru (to the south of Sanjo), Shirakawa-dori Street, Kyoto.
 Kubizuka of Amakusa Shirō, (also being referred to as Senninzuka – memorial mound of 1000 people): located at the ruins of Hara Castle in Kami-Amakusa, Kumamoto Prefecture
 Kubizuka of Asari Katsuyori: located at Hiyama, Noshiro, Akita.
 Kubizuka of Ashikaga Yoshinori: Shinjo Ankokuji Temple, Katō, Hyōgo.
 Kubizuka of Bessho Nagaharu: Miki, Hyōgo.
 Kubizuka for the dead in the Battle of Kawanakajima: two Kubizuka inside and one outside of the Hachimanpara historic park, Nagano.
 Kubizuka of Kiso Yoshinaka: located at Yasaka-no-to Pagoda, Yasui Higashiyama, Kyoto.
 Kubizuka of Kusunoki Masashige: Teramoto Kanshinji Temple, Kawachinagano, Osaka Prefecture.
 Kubizuka for the dead in the Battle of Komaki and Nagakute: located at Yazako, Nagakute, Aichi Prefecture.
 Kubizuka of Kondō Isami: located at Hozo-ji Temple, Motojuku, Okazaki, Aichi.
 Kubizuka of Soga no Iruka: located at Asuka, Nara.
 Kubizuka of Taira no Masakado: located at Ōtemachi, Chiyoda, Tokyo.
 Kubizuka of Nitta Yoshisada: Sagano Takiguchi-dera, Kyoto
 Kubizuka of Matsudaira Nobuyasu: located at Moriguro, Asahi-cho, Okazaki City, Aichi Prefecture.
 Oni Kubizuka: located along National Route 21, Oniiwa Park, Mitake, Gifu.
 Kubizuka of Munenaga Yamaguchi: Daishoji Shincho, Kaga City, Ishikawa Prefecture.

References 

Death customs
Mounds